Millwood is a surname. Notable people with the surname include:

 Ezroy Millwood (1942–2012), Jamaican businessman
 Kevin Millwood (born 1974), American baseball pitcher
 Machel Millwood (born 1979), Jamaican soccer player